Sean Brené Roberge (November 1, 1972 – July 29, 1996) was a Canadian actor.

Life and career
Roberge was born in Toronto, Ontario to parents Rene and Brenda Roberge. He began his career at age 13, appearing in guest roles until landing the role of 'Joe Casper' in the second season of T. and T. He then spent three years playing 'Roger Taft' in the series Tarzan.

He also appeared in John Carpenter's In the Mouth of Madness, Maniac Mansion, Danger Bay, The Campbells, Street Legal, My Secret Identity, Neon Rider, Forever Knight, Tek War, Adderly, Straight Line, Going to War, Road to Avonlea, Katts and Dog and Lena: My 100 Children. His last role was as 'Henry Bird' in a 1996 episode of "F/X: The Series". 

Roberge provided voices for numerous children's cartoons, including Garbage Pail Kids, Hello Kitty's Furry Tale Theater, Beverly Hills Teens, The New Archies, WildC.A.T.S., Care Bears, Sylvanian Families and Babar.

He also played electric guitar with the bands Willy Phosphorus, Days of Heaven and Raunch.

At the 6th Gemini Awards in 1992, Roberge's portrayal of 'Ralph' in the C.B.C.'s Magic Hour episode "The Prom" (1990) earned him a nomination for Best Performance by an Actor in a Leading Role in a Dramatic Program or Mini-Series.

Roberge was killed in a car accident on July 29, 1996 at the age of 23.

External links
 
 
 

1972 births
1996 deaths
20th-century Canadian male actors
Canadian male child actors
Canadian male voice actors
Canadian male television actors
Male actors from Toronto
Road incident deaths in Canada